That Damn Michael Che is an  American sketch comedy streaming television series created by and starring Michael Che that premiered on HBO Max on May 6, 2021. In July 2021, the series was renewed for a second season.

Premise
Each episode follows a theme or incident (police brutality, unemployment, falling in love, etc.) and uses sketches and vignettes to illustrate what it feels like to experience this from a black vantage point. It's less about being "right" and more about being honest, even at the risk of being controversial.

Cast

Main
 Michael Che
 Cecily Strong
 Heidi Gardner
 Colin Quinn
 Ellen Cleghorne
 Colin Jost

Guest
 Omari Hardwick
 Geoffrey Owens
 Godfrey
 Billy Porter
 Method Man
 Chris Distefano
 Anna Drezen
 Ziwe
 Wayne Brady
 David Allen Grier
 Tim Meadows
 Kenan Thompson

Episodes

Series Overview

Season 1 (2021)

Season 2 (2022)

Production

Development
On July 14, 2020, HBO Max gave the then-untitled project a series order consisting of 6 half-hour episodes. The series is created by Michael Che, who also executive produces alongside Lorne Michaels and Erin Doyle. Che, speaking about the project, said: "I'm really excited to be working on this show with HBO Max. It's a project I've been thinking about for a while and we have a lot of sketches we want to shoot so please wear your masks so that we can go into production." On April 19, 2021, it was announced that the series was to be titled That Damn Michael Che and would premiere on May 6, 2021. On July 22, 2021, HBO Max renewed the series for a second season.

Casting
Alongside the initial series order announcement, Che was announced to star in the series. On April 19, 2021, it was announced that Cecily Strong, Heidi Gardner, Colin Quinn, Ellen Cleghorne, and Colin Jost had joined the main cast, with Omari Hardwick, Geoffrey Owens, Godfrey, Billy Porter, and Method Man set to guest star.

Filming
The first season was shot throughout New York, with filming commencing on November 9, 2020, and wrapping on February 1, 2021.

Music
The theme song for season 1 was "You Can't Stop Us Now" from Nas's untitled album. In season 2, the theme song was "You and Your Folks, Me and My Folks" from Funkadelic's album Maggot Brain.

References

External links
 

2020s American sketch comedy television series
2021 American television series debuts
English-language television shows
HBO Max original programming
Television series by Broadway Video
Television series by Universal Television
Television shows filmed in New York (state)